Brookesia valerieae is a species of chameleon, a lizard in the family Chamaeleonidae. The species is endemic to Madagascar. It was first described by Raxworthy in 1991. The IUCN have classed this species as endangered, and it is affected by slash-and-burn agriculture. It is not a protected species.

Etymology
The specific name, valerieae, is in honor of Valerie M. Raxworthy.

Geographic range
B. valerieae is endemic to the Manongarivo Special Reserve (Manongarivo Reserve) in the region of Diana, Madagascar, which is also the species' type locality.

If the species covers the whole area between the reserve and the river, it will be  in area, but this has not been confirmed.

Habitat

Reproduction
B. valerieae is oviparous.

Conservation status
The International Union for Conservation of Nature have classed B. valerieae as an endangered species on their Red List of Threatened Species, as the scale of habitat loss is very high in that area, and is mainly affected by the slash-and-burn method of agriculture. B. valerieae has been used as part of the pet trade/industry. The species occurs in some reserves, but it is currently not a protected species.

Taxonomy
B. valerieae was initially described by English herpetologist Christopher John Raxworthy in 1991. Since 1991, it has been published on under that name at least three times: Glaw and Vences (1994: 239), Nečas (1999: 277), and Townsend et al. (2009). According to the Integrated Taxonomic Information System (ITIS), the taxonomic status of the species is valid.

References

Further reading
Glaw F, Vences M (2006). A Field Guide to the Amphibians and Reptiles of Madagascar, Third Edition. Cologne, Germany: Vences and Glaw Verlag. 496 pp. .
Nečas P (1999). Chameleons: Nature's hidden jewels. Frankfurt am Main, Germany: Edition Chimira. 348 pp.  (Europe),  (USA, Canada). (Brookesia valerieae, p. 277).
Raxworthy CJ (1991). "Field observations on some dwarf chameleons (Brookesia spp.) from rainforest areas of Madagascar, with the description of a new species". Journal of Zoology, London 224: 11-25. (Brookesia valerieae, new species).
Townsend TM, Vieites DR, Glaw F, Vences M (2009). "Testing Species-Level Diversification Hypotheses in Madagascar: The Case of Microendemic Brookesia Leaf Chameleons". Systematic Biology 58 (6): 641–656.

V
Endemic fauna of Madagascar
Reptiles of Madagascar
Endangered fauna of Africa
Reptiles described in 1991
Taxa named by Christopher John Raxworthy